Almenara de Tormes is a village and municipality in the province of Salamanca,  western Spain, and is part of the autonomous community of Castile and León.

See also
 List of municipalities in Salamanca

References

Municipalities in the Province of Salamanca